Ferrazza is an Italian surname. Notable people with the surname include:

Alessio Ferrazza (born 1986), Italian footballer
Daniele Ferrazza (born 1993), Italian curler

See also
Ferrazzi

Italian-language surnames